Akutikha is a rural locality (a selo) and the administrative center of Akutikhinsky Selsoviet, Bystroistoksky District, Altai Krai, Russia. The population was 1,063 as of 2013. There are 28 streets.

Geography 
Akutikha is located 146 km northeast of Bystry Istok (the district's administrative centre) by road. Bystry Istok is the nearest rural locality.

References 

Rural localities in Bystroistoksky District